The 2015–16 Texas Longhorns women's basketball team represents the University of Texas at Austin in the 2015–16 college basketball season. It was head coach Karen Aston's fourth season at Texas. The Longhorns were members of the Big 12 Conference and play their home games at the Frank Erwin Center. They finished the season 31–5, 15–3 in Big 12 play to finish in second place. They advanced to the championship game of the Big 12 women's basketball tournament where they lost to Baylor. They received at-large bid of the NCAA women's basketball tournament where they defeated Alabama State and Missouri in the first and second rounds, UCLA in the sweet sixteen before last year's sweet sixteen rematch to Connecticut in the elite eight.

Rankings
2015–16 NCAA Division I women's basketball rankings

2015–16 media

Television and radio information
Most University of Texas home games were shown on the Longhorn Network, with national telecasts on the Big 12 Conference's television partners. On the radio, women's basketball games aired on KTXX-HD4 "105.3 The Bat", with select games on KTXX-FM 104.9. This was the first year that radio broadcasts had moved from KVET (1300 AM/103.1 FM).

Roster

Schedule

|-
!colspan=12 style="background:#CC5500; color:#FFFFFF;"| Non-conference regular season

|-
!colspan=12 style="background:#CC5500; color:#FFFFFF;"| Big 12 regular season

|-
!colspan=12 style="background:#CC5500; color:#FFFFFF;"| 2016 Big 12 women's basketball tournament

|-
!colspan=12 style="background:#CC5500; color:#FFFFFF;"| NCAA women's tournament

See also
Texas Longhorns women's basketball
2015–16 Texas Longhorns men's basketball team

References

Texas Longhorns women's basketball seasons
Texas
Texas
Texas Longhorns
Texas Longhorns